The following article presents a summary of the 2013 football (soccer) season in Brazil, which is the 112th season of competitive football in the country.

Campeonato Brasileiro Série A

The 2013 Campeonato Brasileiro Série A started on May 26, 2013, and concluded on December 8, 2013.

Cruzeiro declared as the Campeonato Brasileiro Série A champions.

Relegation
The four worst placed teams, which are Portuguesa, Vasco da Gama, Ponte Preta and Náutico, were relegated to the following year's second level.

Campeonato Brasileiro Série B

The 2013 Campeonato Brasileiro Série B started on May 24, 2013, and concluded on November 30, 2013.

Palmeiras declared as the Campeonato Brasileiro Série B champions.

Promotion
The four best placed teams, which are Palmeiras, Chapecoense, Sport and Figueirense, were promoted to the following year's first level.

Relegation
The four worst placed teams, which are Guaratinguetá, Paysandu, São Caetano and ASA, were relegated to the following year's third level.

Campeonato Brasileiro Série C

The 2013 Campeonato Brasileiro Série C started on June 1, 2013, and is scheduled to end on December 1, 2013.

Águia de Marabá
Baraúnas
Barueri
Betim
Brasiliense
Caxias
CRAC
CRB
Cuiabá
Duque de Caxias
Fortaleza
Guarani
Luverdense
Macaé
Madureira
Mogi Mirim
Rio Branco
Sampaio Corrêa
Santa Cruz
Treze
Vila Nova

The Campeonato Brasileiro Série C final was played between Santa Cruz and Sampaio Corrêa.

Santa Cruz declared as the league champions by aggregate score of 2–1.

Promotion
The four best placed teams, which are Santa Cruz, Sampaio Corrêa, Luverdense,  and Vila Nova, were promoted to the following year's second level.

Relegation
The five worst placed teams, which are Baraúnas, Barueri, Brasiliense, CRAC and Rio Branco, were relegated to the following year's fourth level.

Campeonato Brasileiro Série D

The 2013 Campeonato Brasileiro Série D started on June 1, 2013, and concluded on November 3, 2013.

Águia Negra
Aparecidense
Aracruz
Araxá
Botafogo (PB)
Botafogo (SP)
Brasília
Central
CSA
Genus
Goianésia
Guarany de Sobral
Gurupi
J. Malucelli
Juazeirense
Juventude
Lajeadense
Londrina
Maranhão
Marcílio Dias
Metropolitano
Mixto
Nacional (AM)
Náutico (RR)
Nova Iguaçu
Paragominas
Parnahyba
Penapolense
Plácido de Castro
Potiguar
Resende
Salgueiro
Santo André
Sergipe
Tiradentes
Tupi
Villa Nova
Vitória da Conquista
Ypiranga (AP)
Ypiranga (PE)

The Campeonato Brasileiro Série D final was played between Botafogo (PB) and Juventude.

Botafogo (PB) declared as the league champions by aggregate score of 3–2.

Promotion
The four best placed teams, which are Botafogo (PB), Juventude, Salgueiro and Tupi, were promoted to the following year's third level.

Copa do Brasil

The 2013 Copa do Brasil started on April 3, 2013, and concluded on November 27, 2013. The Copa do Brasil final was played between Flamengo and Atlético Paranaense.

Flamengo declared as the cup champions by aggregate score of 3–1.

State championship champions

Youth competition champions

(1) The Copa Nacional do Espírito Santo Sub-17, between 2008 and 2012, was named Copa Brasil Sub-17. The similar named Copa do Brasil Sub-17 is organized by the Brazilian Football Confederation and it was first played in 2013.

Other competition champions

Brazilian clubs in international competitions

Brazil national team
The following table lists all the games played by the Brazilian national team in official competitions and friendly matches during 2013.

Women's football

National team
The following table lists all the games played by the Brazil women's national football team in official competitions and friendly matches during 2013.

International friendly

Valais Women's Cup

Torneio Internacional de Brasília de Futebol Feminino

The Brazil women's national football team competed in the following competitions in 2013:

Campeonato Brasileiro de Futebol Feminino

The 2013 Campeonato Brasileiro de Futebol Feminino started on September 18, 2013, and concluded on December 7, 2013.

América-SP
ASCOOP
Botafogo-PB
Caucaia
Centro Olímpico
Duque de Caxias
Foz Cataratas
Francana
Iranduba
Kindermann
Mixto
Pinheirense
Rio Preto
São Francisco
São José
Tiradentes
Tuna Luso
Vasco da Gama
Viana
Vitória-PE

The Campeonato Brasileiro de Futebol Feminino final was played between Centro Olímpico and São José.

Centro Olímpico declared as the league champions by aggregate score of 4–3.

Copa do Brasil de Futebol Feminino

The 2013 Copa do Brasil de Futebol Feminino started on February 2, 2013, and concluded on May 4, 2013.

São José declared as the cup champions by aggregate score of 5–1.

Domestic competition champions

Brazilian clubs in international competitions

References

 Brazilian competitions at RSSSF

 
Seasons in Brazilian football